Events in the year 2010 in Iraq.

Incumbents
 President: Jalal Talabani
 Prime Minister: Nouri al-Maliki
 Vice President: Tariq al-Hashimi, Adil Abdul-Mahdi 
 Iraqi Kurdistan Regional Government (autonomous region)
 President: Massoud Barzani
 Prime Minister: Barham Salih

Events

January
 January 25 - 3 suicide car bombs explode in Baghdad, killing at least 37 people  
January 27 - the Islamic State of Iraq claims the suicide car bombing attack

February
February 1 - A female suicide bomber killed 54, and injured 100 Shia Pilgrims on their way to Karbala

March
 March 7 – A parliamentary election was held in Iraq on 7 March 2010. The secular, non-sectarian Iraqi National Movement received the most votes.
 March 8 – Oil extraction rights to the Maysan Oilfields were granted to China March 8, 2010.

April
 April 18 - Iraqi SOF conducted an operation southwest of Tikrit that killed Abu Ayyub al-Masri and Abu Omar al-Baghdadi, the two leaders of the ISI, a U.S. UH-60 Blackhawk supporting the operation crashed killing a Ranger Sergeant and injuring the aircrew.
 April 20 - Al-Qaeda's Northern commander (Kirkuk, Salahuddin and Nineveh Governorates) was killed in a joint raid in Mosul.

May
 May 10 - A series of attacks in Baghdad, Mosul, Fallujah, along with other cities, kills 85 people and injures 140

June
 June 20 - 2 suicide car bombs detonate near the Trade Bank of Iraq, killing 26 and wounding 50 people

July

August 
 August 2 – The New York Times reported that the United States would "withdraw designated combat forces from Iraq by the end of August."
 August 3 – At least 5 police officers are shot dead at a checkpoint in Baghdad, Iraq.
 August 7 – 5 Iraqi policemen are killed in an overnight shootout in western Baghdad, while 1 policeman is killed at a checkpoint outside Fallujah.
 August 18 – The 4th Stryker Brigade, 2nd Infantry Division crosses the international border between Iraq and Kuwait, effectively ending U.S combat operations within the country of Iraq. 52,600 U.S. military personnel remain in Iraq to take on an advisory role as Operation New Dawn begins.
 August 19 – U.S. President Barack Obama announced that all U.S.combat operations will end on August 31. 50,000 troops will stay in an advise and assist role. The full withdrawal is scheduled for December 2011.

September
 September 13 – A civilian is killed and six people injured in fighting in Iraq's Diyala Governorate.
 September 15 – US and Iraqi forces raid a neighbourhood in Fallujah resulting in at least six casualties.
 September 17 – An Iraqi Army soldier is killed and eleven people are wounded following two bombs going off in Baghdad.
 September 19 – 2 car bombs explode in Baghdad, Iraq, killing at least 31 people and injuring 111.
 September 26 – The Islamic Revolutionary Guard Corps cross the border into Iraq and kill 30 Kurds.

October

November

December

Notable deaths 

 January 25 – Ali Hassan al-Majid, 68, Iraqi military commander and government minister, execution by hanging.
 March 15 - Kazim al-Samawi, 85, in Stockholm, Iraqi poet.
 April 18 – Abu Abdullah al-Rashid al-Baghdadi, Iraqi  terrorist (Al-Qaeda), airstrike.
 September 7 – Riad al-Saray, 35, Iraqi television presenter, shot.
 September 8 – Safah Abdul Hameed, Iraqi journalist, shot.

See also 

 Iraq War
 Withdrawal of U.S. troops from Iraq

Notes

External links

Obama Claims End to Combat Operations in Iraq, But Iraqis See Same War Under a Different Name - video report by Democracy Now!

 
Years of the 21st century in Iraq